Discography of the Norwegian electronic musician Aleksander Vinter.

Unknown dates are marked as (?), dates from third party sources close to predicted dates are marked with a (?) alongside said date.

Aliases

Savant 
Main alias, active, electronic

Albums

EPs

Singles

Remixes

Mixtapes

Datakrash 
Active, hip-hop

Albums

EPs

Singles

Remixes

Mixtapes

Vinter 
Active, pop/RnB

Singles

Aleksander Vinter (self-alias) 
Active, orchestral

Albums

EPs

Singles

Remixes

Blanco 
Semi-active, electronic/reggae

Albums

EPs

Singles

Remixes

Mixtapes

Spray & Play Games 
Semi-active, chiptune

Albums

Vinter In Hollywood 
Inactive, pop/rock

Albums

EPs

Singles

Mixtapes

Remixes

Vinter In Vegas 
Inactive, experimental/IDM

Albums

The Christopher Walkens 
Inactive, rock (surf music)

EPs

Gunslinger Jones 
Inactive, house (electronic)

Singles

Remixes

Megatron 
Inactive, metal

Albums

Singles

Protos 
Inactive, rock

EPs

Singles

Winterbliss 
Inactive, rock

EPs

Morphine 
Inactive, metal/noise

Singles

Remixes

Numa 
Inactive, techno

Singles

Remixes

Starsheriffs 
Inactive, pop/rock

Albums

Singles

Metahouse 
Inactive, ?

Singles

Ninjaspliff 
Inactive, Hip-Hop

Singles

Groups

No Funeral 
Inactive, metal

Albums

EPs

Singles

Remixes

Vega ¤ Vinter 
Inactive, punk/jazz

Albums

Twin World 
Inactive, trance (electronic)

EPs

Remixes

Staal 
Inactive, metal

Albums

Singles

Overall

References 

Discographies of Norwegian artists
Electronic music discographies
Savant (musician) albums